Java Lane SC (also known as Javalane) is a Sri Lankan professional football club based in Slave Island in Colombo.
The club plays in the top-tier football league of Sri Lanka, the Sri Lanka Champions League.

Honours

Domestic
League
 Sri Lanka division 1: 1
 2012

Cups
 Silver cup: 2
 2009, 2012
 Sri Lanka Gold Cup: 1
 2012, 2013 (Finalist)
 Assad Salley Trophy: 1
 2010

Current squad
Fernando Manjula
Serphat Khamadullal

Current staff

References

 Club profile on Soccerway.com.

Football clubs in Sri Lanka